The Serbia men's national under-18 3x3 team ( / Muška reprezentacija Srbije u basketu do 18 godina) represents Serbia in international under-18 3x3 basketball matches and is controlled by the Basketball Federation of Serbia.

Competitions

Youth Olympic Games

FIBA 3x3 Under-18 World Cup

FIBA Under-18 Europe Cup

See also 
 Serbia men's national 3x3 team
 Serbia men's national under-18 basketball team

References

External links
 Basketball Federation of Serbia 

National youth 3x3 basketball teams
U
3x3 basketball in Serbia